Oxycnemis fusimacula  is a moth of the family Noctuidae first described by John Bernhardt Smith in 1902. It is found in California, Nevada and Baja California.

The wingspan is about 24 mm. Adults are on wing from July to August.

Larvae have been reared on Krameria parvifolia.

References

Poole, Robert W. "Oxycnemis fusimacula Smith". nearctica.com. Retrieved January 4, 2021.

Cuculliinae
Moths of North America
Fauna of the California chaparral and woodlands
Fauna of the Colorado Desert
Fauna of the Mojave Desert
Natural history of the Peninsular Ranges
Moths described in 1902